Tugay Kerimoğlu (born 24 August 1970) is a Turkish former professional footballer who played as a midfielder. He spent the majority of his career for Galatasaray and Blackburn Rovers; winning silverware at Rangers F.C. in-between. He was the coordinator of the Galatasaray youth academy, after a short spell working with Mark Hughes at Manchester City. He was the assistant coach to Roberto Mancini at Galatasaray during the 2013–14 season.

Club career
Tugay was born and raised in Istanbul. He started playing football in youth academy of Trabzonspor. His father, Ozkan, was a semi-professional footballer before becoming a bank manager and his brother, Tolgay, was also a football player.

He played for Galatasaray from 1987 to 2000, where he won the Turkish League six times and the Turkish Cup four times. The midfielder was made captain at Galatasaray in the 1992–93 season, making him the youngest captain in the history of his club. He had signed for Scottish club Rangers in the January 2000 mid season transfer window, and joined Blackburn Rovers for the 2001–02 season.

Former Galatasaray boss Graeme Souness brought Tugay to Ewood Park from Scottish side Rangers F.C. in the summer of 2001 for a £1.3m fee. His debut for Rovers was as a substitute against Sunderland. His first goal came on 14 October 2001 in a 7–1 home thrashing against West Ham United in which he scored with a trademark effort from outside the box, lobbing the keeper. Tugay immediately became a fan favourite at Blackburn, where he was an integral part of the club's success on the field since his first season. He missed Blackburn's League Cup final win in 2002 through suspension. Tugay was named Blackburn's Player of the Year in the 2003–04 campaign.

Tugay's final career goal came against Portsmouth in a 3–2 Premier League defeat at Fratton Park on 30 November 2008. He retired from football on 24 May 2009 at the age of 38. His last game was against West Bromwich Albion at home at Ewood Park in front of a crowd of over 28,000 fans, who applauded Tugay during the match when he was substituted in the 85th minute to be replaced by Swedish left back Martin Olsson.

International career
Tugay has represented Turkey at Euro 1996, Euro 2000 and the 2002 FIFA World Cup, where Turkey finished in the quarter finals of Euro 2000 and third place in the 2002 World Cup. He retired from international football in 2003 after Turkey failed to qualify for Euro 2004 in order to focus on his Blackburn Rovers career. His last match was on 5 June 2007 in a friendly against Brazil in Dortmund, Germany. He wore number 94 to commemorate his 94 caps for his country.

Style of play and reception
Primarily a deep-lying playmaker in midfield, he was also competent as an attacking midfielder or playing in the holding role. He was widely recognised for his ability and was highly rated in the football industry. In 2000, former Romanian midfielder Gheorghe Hagi rated him as one of the finest ball-playing midfielders in Europe, and in 2006, Manchester United manager Sir Alex Ferguson had suggested that if he were ten years younger, Tugay's ability would make him an ideal player for the Old Trafford team. When Tugay's manager at the time, Mark Hughes, was asked if he too wished Tugay was ten years younger, his answer was "No, because if he was, he'd be playing in a Barcelona shirt."

Managerial career
On 3 June 2009, Tugay began working with his former manager Mark Hughes behind the scenes at Manchester City academy in a coaching role. He was linked for various assistant positions for the Turkish national team after Fatih Terim's departure, however he became the coordinator for the Galatasaray youth academy in February 2010.

On 21 October 2010, Galatasaray SK announced that Tugay was assigned for the position of the new assistant coach for Galatasaray, alongside of Gheorghe Hagi. On 22 March 2011, Hagi was sacked following a string of poor results. Tugay refused to become the head coach until the end of the season, saying it would be wrong to accept the position for the head coach right after the sacking of Hagi.

On 4 October 2013, Galatasaray SK announced that Tugay was assigned again for the position of the new assistant coach for Galatasaray, this time alongside of Roberto Mancini. However, after Mancini's dismissal at the end of the 2013–14 season, he left his position.

In November 2015 he took over the Turkish second division club Şanlıurfaspor and worked as head coach for the first time. In April 2016 he left the club by mutual agreement following a lack of success.

Personal life
Tugay generally keeps himself out of the media spotlight, and even with very good English and an apparent good sense of humour, he rarely gives an interview, even to his previous club's own radio station (Radio Rovers). Tugay was married to Etkin, a former Galatasaray and Turkish international basketball player. He has two children, named Berke and Melissa. As a youngster, he was also an extremely promising motor racer, competing as high as a Formula 3 level. Tugay describes himself as a Muslim, stating that it's "something which is in my heart and I don't need to express that to other people".

Career statistics

Club

International

Honours
Galatasaray
1.Lig: 1987–88, 1992–93, 1993–94, 1996–97, 1997–98, 1998–99
Turkish Cup: 1990–91, 1992–93, 1995–96, 1998–99
Turkish Super Cup: 1988, 1991, 1993, 1996, 1997

Rangers
Scottish Premier League: 1999–2000
Scottish Cup: 1999–2000

Blackburn Rovers
Football League Cup: 2001–02

Turkey U21
Mediterranean Games: 1993

Turkey
FIFA World Cup Third place: 2002

Individual
Blackburn Rovers Player of the Year: 2003–04

References

External links

ESPN profile

1970 births
Living people
Footballers from Istanbul
Turkish footballers
Turkey international footballers
Association football midfielders
Turkish expatriate footballers
Expatriate footballers in Scotland
Expatriate footballers in England
Turkish expatriate sportspeople in England
Turkish expatriate sportspeople in Scotland
Galatasaray S.K. footballers
Rangers F.C. players
Blackburn Rovers F.C. players
UEFA Cup winning players
Scottish Premier League players
Premier League players
Süper Lig players
UEFA Euro 1996 players
UEFA Euro 2000 players
2002 FIFA World Cup players
Galatasaray S.K. (football) non-playing staff
Turkey under-21 international footballers
Turkey youth international footballers
Manchester City F.C. non-playing staff
Mediterranean Games silver medalists for Turkey
Mediterranean Games medalists in football
Competitors at the 1993 Mediterranean Games
Turkish football managers
Turkish Muslims